The 2018 NCAA Rifle Championships took place from March 9 to March 10 in Charleston, South Carolina, at the McAlister Field House. The tournament went into its 39th consecutive NCAA Rifle Championships, and featured eight teams across all divisions.

Team results

 Note: Top 8 only
 (H): Team from hosting U.S. state

Individual results

 Note: Table does not include consolation
 (H): Individual from hosting U.S. State

References

2018 in American sports
2018 in sports in South Carolina
NCAA Rifle Championship
NCAA